= John C. Biggins =

American banker

- Died: September 18, 1971 (age 61)
- Citizenship: United States
- Occupation: bank executive
- Employer: Franklin Bank of Paterson
- Known for: invented Charg-It, a forerunner of the bank credit card
- Children: 3

John C. Biggins (died September 18, 1971) was an American banker and the inventor of Charg-It, a forerunner of the bank credit card. He created Charg-It in 1946 while working for Flatbush National Bank in Brooklyn, New York. At the time of his death, he was chairman of Franklin Bank of Paterson, New Jersey. He had earlier been the bank's president. Notable positions he held include being a member of the board of trustees of St. Joseph's Hospital of Paterson, President of the Garden State Credit Bureau, Director of Group Health Insurance of New York, and the Hamilton Club. He was married with three children and died in 1971.
